Iwiji is an administrative ward in the Mbeya Rural district of the Mbeya Region of Tanzania. In 2016 the Tanzania National Bureau of Statistics report there were 9,973 people in the ward, from 15,056 in 2012.

Villages and hamlets 
The ward has 3 villages, and 24 hamlets.

 Iwiji
 Iwiji
 Mabula
 Magole
 Mtukula
 Ntinga
 Soweto
 Vimetu
 Isende
 Isende
 Kalashi
 Luhuma
 Masala
 Nachingwengwe
 Shihola
 Shinandala
 Izumbwe II
 Chawama
 Chilanzi
 Hayende
 Ikese
 Ileya A
 Ileya B
 Kafule
 Lupamba
 Sayuma
 Songwe

References 

Wards of Mbeya Region